Chillu is a 1982 Indian Malayalam film, directed by Lenin Rajendran. The film stars Rony Vincent, Shanthi Krishna, Venu Nagavally, Sukumari, Jagathy Sreekumar, Adoor Bhasi and Nedumudi Venu in the lead roles. The film has musical score by M. B. Sreenivasan.

Plot
Annie (Shanthi Krishna) is in love with her college mate Manu (Rony Vincent). Manu is a strange character who is a short tempered. Both get in quarrels with each other, but they soon reunite. Annie is also close in touch with an artist Ananthu (Venu Nagavally), which disturbs Manu. Time goes by and Annie visits a doctor which creates a suspicion in Manu that she is pregnant. Manu and Annie part ways and Manu wants to marry Lali, another girl. Annie also attends the wedding and cries after the wedding. On the first night, Manu realises his mistake and goes to visit Annie.

Cast
Rony Vincent as Manu George
Shanthi Krishna as Annie
Venu Nagavally as Ananthu
Sukumari 
Jagathy Sreekumar as James
Adoor Bhasi
Nedumudi Venu as Josukutty
Jalaja as Ananthu's lover
Kanakalatha as servant
Anitha

Soundtrack
The music was composed by M. B. Sreenivasan and the lyrics was written by O. N. V. Kurup, Kavalam Narayana Panicker and Edasseri.

References

External links
 

1982 films
1980s Malayalam-language films
Films directed by Lenin Rajendran
Films scored by M. B. Sreenivasan